Men of Bronze is the 2005 historical novel debut of American author Scott Oden; an ancient Egyptian tale inspired by the writings of Herodotus and by Oden's love of the pulp-fiction tales of Robert E. Howard.

Plot summary 
It is 526 B.C. and the empire of the Pharaohs is dying, crushed by the weight of its own antiquity. Decay riddles its cities, infects its aristocracy, and weakens its armies. While across the expanse of Sinai, like jackals drawn to carrion, the forces of the King of Persia watch . . . and wait.

Leading the fight to preserve the soul of Egypt is Hasdrabal Barca, the Pharaoh's deadliest killer. Possessed of a rage few men can fathom and fewer can withstand, Barca struggles each day to preserve the last sliver of his humanity. But, when one of Egypt's most celebrated generals, a Greek mercenary called Phanes, defects to the Persians, it triggers a savage war that will tax Barca's skills, and his humanity, to the limit. From the political wasteland of Palestine, to the searing deserts east of the Nile, to the streets of ancient Memphis, Barca and Phanes play a desperate game of cat-and-mouse — a game culminating in the bloodiest battle of Egypt's history.

Caught in the midst of this violence is Jauharah, a slave in the House of Life. She is Arabian, dark-haired and proud — a healer with gifts her blood, her station, and her gender overshadow. Though her hands tend to Barca's countless wounds, it is her spirit that heals and changes him. Once a fearsome demigod of war, Hasdrabal Barca becomes human again. A man now motivated as much by love as anger.

Nevertheless, honor and duty have bound Barca to the fate of Egypt. A final conflict remains, a reckoning set to unfold in the dusty hills east of Pelusium. There, over the dead of two nations, Hasdrabal Barca will face the same choice as the heroes of old: Death and eternal fame . . .

Or obscurity and long life . . .

Publication Details 
First published: Medallion Press, Inc., United States, 2005.
Also published in the UK by Transworld, Russia by Hemiro, Ltd., and the Czech Republic by Domino.

External links 
Publisher's Website
An Essay by Steve Tompkins for The Cimmerian

2005 American novels
American historical novels
Novels set in ancient Egypt
Novels set in the 6th century BC
2005 debut novels